Scarcroft is a village and civil parish  north east of Leeds city centre in the City of Leeds metropolitan borough, West Yorkshire, England. The village lies on the main A58 road between Leeds and Wetherby. It had a population of 1,153 increasing to 1,194 at the 2011 Census.

The village of Bardsey is further  eastwards on the A58 towards Wetherby.

The Scarcroft Watermill was built in 1810 to grind corn.

There is one pub in Scarcroft, the New Inn, established in 1852. It was at one time called The Bracken Fox but reverted to its former name in 2011. The village's shop and post office have closed. The closest local shops are in Bardsey, Shadwell and Whinmoor. The closest supermarkets are Tesco in Seacroft and Morrisons in Wetherby.

Scarcroft is also renowned for having among the most expensive streets in Leeds: Bracken Park, recently revealed as the most expensive and Ling Lane, regularly appearing in top ten lists.

Location grid

See also
Listed buildings in Scarcroft

References

External links

 Scarcroft Parish Council website
 BBC Leeds - Where I Live - Scarcroft mini guide
 The Ancient Parish of Thorner at GENUKI: Scarcroft was in this parish

Places in Leeds
Villages in West Yorkshire
Civil parishes in West Yorkshire